Stephen David James Torpey (born 8 December 1970) is an English former professional footballer who played as a striker.

Playing career
Born in Islington, London, Torpey had played for a number of clubs, before signing for Scunthorpe United from Bristol City in February 2000. He was Scunthorpe's record transfer signing, costing £175,000. Torpey broke the ten goal barrier in each of his first five seasons at Scunthorpe and represented the club over 250 times.

He was released at the end of the 2006–07 season, after only playing a small part in the club's promotion to the Championship. He subsequently signed for League Two side Lincoln City on a one-year contract on 27 June 2007, but was loaned out to Conference Premier side Farsley Celtic on 20 November until 7 January 2008. He was released by Lincoln on this date and joined Farsley on a permanent contract. He later joined the backroom staff at the club. He found himself consigned to the bench at the start of the 2008–09 season and, after making just two substitute appearances, moved on to North Ferriby United of the Northern Premier League Premier Division. He made his Ferriby debut as a substitute in a 2–1 home defeat to Kendal Town on 6 September 2008. With Ferriby he made 23 appearances and scored five goals in all competitions.

Coaching career
Torpey was appointed as youth-team coach at York City on 15 December 2008 on a part-time basis, as this would allow him to continue training apprentices at Hull City. He offered his services as a player for York in April 2009 and he came on as a 79th-minute substitute in a 1–0 victory over Eastbourne Borough on 18 April. He started the last game of the Conference Premier season, a 1–1 draw at Lewes on 26 April 2009, which was his last appearance as a player. He resumed his playing career after being registered by York on 3 September 2010. Following Martin Foyle's resignation on 24 September 2010 Torpey took over as assistant to caretaker manager Andy Porter, before becoming caretaker manager on 8 October following Porter's departure. His first and only game in charge came the following day with a 4–0 defeat away at Newport County, and his tenure ended on 13 October 2010 when Tamworth manager Gary Mills was appointed.

After Nigel Worthington was appointed manager, Torpey was given the position of first-team coach on 5 March 2013, and after Worthington signed a new contract as manager on 3 May, Torpey was promoted to the position of assistant manager. After Worthington resigned as manager of York on 13 October 2014 Torpey took over as caretaker manager, but resumed his role as assistant manager after his former Scunthorpe teammate Russ Wilcox was appointed manager on 16 October 2014. He parted company with York on 11 May 2015, but returned to the club as youth-team coach on 17 December. On 29 March 2018, it was announced that he was leaving as he had accepted a post with the Professional Footballers' Association as a coach educator.

Career statistics

Managerial statistics

Honours
Swansea City
Football League Trophy: 1993–94

Scunthorpe United
Football League One: 2006–07

References

External links

 (to 2007–08)
 (2008–09)

1970 births
Living people
Footballers from Islington (district)
English footballers
Association football forwards
Millwall F.C. players
Bradford City A.F.C. players
Swansea City A.F.C. players
Bristol City F.C. players
Notts County F.C. players
Scunthorpe United F.C. players
Lincoln City F.C. players
Farsley Celtic A.F.C. players
North Ferriby United A.F.C. players
York City F.C. players
English Football League players
National League (English football) players
Northern Premier League players
English football managers
York City F.C. managers
National League (English football) managers
York City F.C. non-playing staff